Hahn Dae-soo (Hangul: 한대수; born March 12, 1948) is a South Korean folk rock singer-songwriter. He is considered South Korea's "master of folk rock" and a pioneer of 1960s Korean hippie culture.

Biography
Hahn Dae-soo was born in Busan and attended elementary school there until he was ten years old. In 1958, his family moved to New York City and he spent the next four years at P.S. 125 Elementary School in Harlem. He returned to Pusan for three years of junior high school and the first year of high school before returning to the US, where he eventually graduated from A.G. Berner high school in Long Island.
In 1966 he was admitted to the University of New Hampshire to study veterinary medicine, but transferred after a year to the New York Institute of Photography.
In the meantime, he continued to develop his musical talent and, in 1968, began performing in South Korea's burgeoning folk scene. He was particularly active in 1969, performing a number of concerts on the college circuit, before being conscripted to join Korea's armed forces. He spent the next three years as a gunner on board a Korean warship. He returned to music in 1974, releasing his first album. During the intervening years, a number of artists, including Yang Hee-eun and Kim Min-ki, covered his songs on their own releases.

Drawing on influences from John Lennon, Leonard Cohen and Bob Dylan, his first two albums, Long-long road (1974) and Rubber Shoes (Gomusin, 1975) were not overtly anti-government, but sufficiently so to draw attention from the Park Chung Hee government. The two albums were subsequently banned, forcing Hahn Dae-soo into exile in New York City. These two albums became masterpieces in K-pop history. "Give me some water" ("물 좀 주소") and "The nation of Happiness" ("행복의 나라") became youth anthems.

In New York, he formed a post-punk rock band called Genghis Khan. Although they never released an album, some of their recordings are included in the thirteenth CD of The Box (2005). With gigs CBGB and Trude Heller, they got a little popularity but soon disbanded. Hahn continued his career as a photographer until 1989.

In 1989 the producer from his first album contacted him and they began work on "Infinity" (1989). It was critically well-received, but didn't produce a hit on the Korean charts. In 1990 he joined with jazz guitarist Jack Lee and released his fourth album Loss of Memory. Its A side was a sound collage of free music. He returned to his political folk roots on side B. With pianist Lee Woo-chang, younger brother of Jack Lee, Hahn released his 5th album Angels' Talkin''' in 1991.

During the more liberal political climate of the 1990s he re-emerged as a veteran of Korean folk music. His early recordings were re-issued on CD and he performed live. His 1997 performance in Fukuoka, Japan was released as his 6th CD. His 7th album Age of Reason, Age of Treason was recorded in New York in 1999.
In 2000 he formed a band with Lee Woo-chang & Kim Do-gyun,a leading guitarist in the Korean metal scene, and released the albums Eternal Sorrow (2000), Source of Trouble (2002) and The Hurt'' (2004).

His musical style stresses simple but powerful lyrics, with themes ranging from love for his wife to trouble with government, and reflects a global outlook gained from growing up in two countries. He is often referred to as "the Korean John Lennon".

During the year of 2007, he had a daughter now named Michelle.

Discography

See also
 List of people of Korean descent
 List of South Korean musicians
 List of North Korean musicians
 Contemporary culture of South Korea
 Korean folk music

References

External links 
 Hahn Dae-soo – official site and biography, English and Korean

20th-century South Korean male singers
South Korean radio presenters
South Korean folk rock singers
South Korean rock guitarists
People from Busan
1948 births
Living people
21st-century South Korean male singers